Vijay Jacob, is an Indian music composer.

Career
Vijay Jacob entered the film industry as a keyboard programmer in 2004. He worked with many music directors like M Jayachandran, Bijibal, Deepak Dev, Jassie Gift.  He became an independent film score composer with the Malayalam cinema Melle and composed the song "Punjapadathe" He has scored the background music as well for the movie Melle   - a folkish tune in Vaikom Vijayalakshmi's voice.

References

External links
Melle – second song
Punjapadathe – song release

Malayalam film score composers
Living people
1980 births